In quantum mechanics, negativity is a measure of quantum entanglement which is easy to compute. It is a measure deriving from the PPT criterion for separability. It has shown to be an entanglement monotone and hence a proper measure of entanglement.

Definition
The negativity  of a subsystem  can be defined in terms of a density matrix  as:     

where:
 is the trace norm or the sum of the singular values of the operator .

An alternative and equivalent definition is the absolute sum of the negative eigenvalues of :

where  are all of the eigenvalues.

Properties

 Is a convex function of :

 Is an entanglement monotone:

where  is an arbitrary LOCC operation over

Logarithmic negativity
The logarithmic negativity is an entanglement measure which is easily computable and an upper bound to the distillable entanglement.
It is defined as

where  is the partial transpose operation and  denotes the trace norm.

It relates to the negativity as follows:

Properties

The logarithmic negativity 
 can be zero even if the state is entangled (if the state is PPT entangled).
 does not reduce to the entropy of entanglement on pure states like most other entanglement measures.
 is additive on tensor products: 
 is not asymptotically continuous.
 is an upper bound to the distillable entanglement

References
 This page uses material from Quantiki licensed under GNU Free Documentation License 1.2

Quantum information science